Cynthia A. Phillips is a researcher at the Center for Computing Research of Sandia National Laboratories, known for her work in combinatorial optimization.

Education
Phillips earned a bachelor's degree in applied mathematics from the Massachusetts Institute of Technology (MIT) in 1983, 
a master's degree in electrical engineering and computer science from MIT in 1985, and a doctorate in computer science from MIT in 1990.
Her dissertation, on parallel algorithms, was supervised by Charles Leiserson.

Recognition
In 2015 the Association for Computing Machinery listed her as a Distinguished Member.
She became a Fellow of the Society for Industrial and Applied Mathematics in 2016 "for contributions to the theory and applications of combinatorial optimization".

References

External links
 

Year of birth missing (living people)
Living people
20th-century American mathematicians
21st-century American mathematicians
American women mathematicians
American women computer scientists
American computer scientists
MIT School of Engineering alumni
Fellows of the Society for Industrial and Applied Mathematics
Sandia National Laboratories people
20th-century women mathematicians
21st-century women mathematicians
20th-century American women
21st-century American women